Sømarkedyssen is a neolithic megalithic tomb located near  on the Danish island of Møn

Dating back to approximately 3400 BC, the tomb consists of an octagonal chamber. A big boulder serves as a capstone, supported by seven load-bearing stones. Leading to the burial chamber, the corridor is covered with a smaller boulder, supported by four stones, whose upper surface has more than 180 bowl-shaped carvings dating from the Bronze Age.

Context 
A total of 119 megalithic tombs of the neolithic period are known on the 231 square kilometers of the Møn and Bogø islands, of which 38 have been conserved and protected, and 21 were from the Beaker culture which, like polygonal dolmens, emerged towards 3500-2800 BC.

See also 
 Megaliths
 passage tomb
 Grønsalen
 Klekkende Høj

Bibliography 
 Karsten Kjer Michaelsen: Politikens bog om Danmarks oldtid. Politiken, Kopenhagen 2002, p. 217.
 Peter V. Glob: Vorzeitdenkmäler Dänemarks. Wachholtz, Neumünster 1968.

References 

Megalithic monuments in Denmark
Neolithic sites
Tombs
Bronze Age sites
Dolmens
Møn